Édgar Borges Olivera (born 15 July 1969), known as Edgar Borges, is a Uruguayan retired footballer.

Notes

External links

Edgar Borges at playmakerstats.com (English version of ceroacero.es)
Profile in Tenfield Digital 

1969 births
Living people
Uruguayan footballers
Uruguayan expatriate footballers
Uruguay international footballers
Danubio F.C. players
Club Nacional de Football players
Liverpool F.C. (Montevideo) players
Deportes Temuco footballers
Rangers de Talca footballers
Lille OSC players
AS Beauvais Oise players
Grenoble Foot 38 players
1991 Copa América players
Uruguayan Primera División players
Chilean Primera División players
Ligue 1 players
Ligue 2 players
Expatriate footballers in Chile
Expatriate footballers in France
Association football defenders